Bring Him Home may refer to:

"Bring Him Home" (Les Misérables), song from  musical Les Misérables
"(How Could You) Bring Him Home", 2006 song by Eamon
Bring Him Home (album),  2010 album by Alfie Boe